Element Yachts is a second generation Canadian boatbuilding company located in Erin, Ontario. The company is currently producing the Element line of express cruiser boats with the first model of the series, the  Element 270 EXC beginning production in 2005. Element Yachts focuses primarily on the powerboat sector of the boating market, and sells its products worldwide.

Group structure

Element Yachts is a subsidiary of the Element Corporation which consists of the following companies:

Element Yachts (Express cruiser powerboats)
Element Composites (Composite structures for commercial and military use)
Element Power Center (Engine replacement services with modern, fuel efficient engines)

This facility has the capacity to produce composite boats and structures up to  x  x  in size.

History
Element Yachts originally began life as the P.C. Mould Company. P.C. Mould produced the historic Dragonfly sailboat under license and re-formed in their present location as Contour Yachts.

Contour Yachts produced the unique and well regarded Contour line of sailing trimarans throughout the 1980s and 1990s. These 3-hulled sailing craft offer excellent stability and speed compared to mono hull or catamaran sailboats. The construction and build quality of the Contour boats have been a key feature in the magazine reviews of the day. Contour is a historical name and fixture in the Canadian yachting and boating industry. Their efforts helped develop the trimaran as a serious sailing vessel, which are now recognized as stable and high-speed platform for lake and ocean sailing.

When the founder retired, the rights to the Contour sailboat line was sold off and the 2nd generation took over and reformed the company as Element Yachts. The founder and family have been very active in the boating and sailing industry in Canada for many years and actively race on historic 8-metre keelboats and have patented a method of sailboat mast manufacturing.

See also 

 Boat building industry in Ontario

External links

References

Canadian boat builders
Canadian brands
Companies based in Ontario
Manufacturing companies of Canada
Manufacturing companies based in Ontario